Samuel Tolver Preston (8 July 1844 – 1917) was an English engineer and physicist.

His parents were Daniel Bloom Preston (born 1807) and Mary Susannah Tolver. Preston was educated as a Telegraph-engineer. He went to Munich where he attained his Ph.D in 1894 with Ludwig Boltzmann. After that, he worked as a teacher.

He is known for his works (1875–1894) on the kinetic theory of gases and his attempts to combine this theory with Le Sage's theory of gravitation. In his book Physics of the Ether (1875) he claimed that if matter is subdivided into ether particles, they would travel at the speed of light and represent an enormous amount of energy. In this way, one grain of matter would contain energy equal to 1000 million foot-tons (whereby one foot-ton = 2240 foot pounds).

Preston also seemed to be the first (1885) to recognize the redundancy of Michael Faraday's explanation of electromagnetic induction.  Einstein recognized a similar problem in his paper "On the electrodynamics of moving bodies" (1905, i.e. special relativity).

In 1876 he corresponded with James Clerk Maxwell and alluded to the work of John James Waterston. In 1880 he corresponded with Charles Robert Darwin.

Publications
Physics of the ether; 1875
On some dynamical conditions applicable to LeSage’s theory of gravitation (1877); Phil. Mag., fifth ser. Vol. 4 (1877), pp. 206–213, 364-375; Vol. 5 (1878), pp. 117–127, 297-311
Mode of the Propagation of Sound, and the Physical Condition Determining its Velocity on the Basis of the Kinetic Theory of Gases; (1877)
Temperature Equilibrium in the Universe in Relation to the Kinetic Theory; Nature 20, 1879, p. 28
On the Possibility of Accounting for the Continuance of Recurring Changes in the Universe, consistently with the Tendency to Temperature-Equilibrium;  Philosophical Magazine 8, 1879, p. 152/163.
On the possibility of explaining the continuance of life in the Universe Consistent with the Tendency to Temperature-equilibrium; Nature 19, 1879, p. 460/462
On Method in Causal Research; in: Philosophical magazine, ix (1880), S. 356–367
A Question regarding one of the Physical Premises upon which the Finality of Universal Change is based; Philosophical Magazine 10, 1880, p. 338/342.
Science and sectarian religion; in: S. T. Preston, Original essays; London, 1884, S. 19–51.
Ueber das gegenseitige Verhältniss einiger zur dynamischen Erklärung der Gravitation aufgestellten Hypothesen; Inauguraldissertation von 1894, München, Phil. Fak.
Comparative Review of some Dynamical Theories of Gravitation;  Philosophical Magazine 1895, Vol. 35, p. 145ff.
On Certain Questions connected with Astronomical Physics;  Philosophical Magazine 1906, Vol. 12, p. 560ff.
On Certain Questions connected with Astronomical Physics, Part II;  Philosophical Magazine 1907, Vol. 14, p. 265ff.
On some Physical Relations affecting Matter in Diverse Stages of Subdivision;  Philosophical Magazine 1908, Vol. 16, p. 345ff.

See also
 Olinto De Pretto

References

External links

Bettini: A Cosmic Archipelago: Multiverse Scenarios in the History of Modern Cosmology. 

1844 births
1917 deaths
English physicists
English engineers